Fabrizio Anzalone (born 24 July 1978) is an Italian footballer. He played over 140 games in Serie C1 and over 110 games in Serie C2. He only briefly played in Serie B in 2006–07 season.

Biography

Early career
Born in Genoa, Liguria, Anzalone started his career at Genoa C.F.C. He made his Serie B debut on 13 April 1997, replacing Filippo Masolini in the final minutes. Since 1997–98 season he was loaned to Serie C2 teams Catanzaro, Fiorenzuola and Imperia. In mid-2000 he was sold to Serie C1 and Ligurian side Spezia. He only played 7 times before transferred to Alzano in January 2002, as the club bought Spezia's half. In June 2002 Genoa gave up the remain 50% registration rights to Alzano. He played 26 times in 2002–03 Serie C1 but the team bankrupted at the end of season.

Ravenna
Since 2003–04 season Anzalone played for Ravenna Calcio, winning promotion play-offs in 2005 (partnered with Marco Bianchi as centre-backs) and after two seasons in Serie C1, promoted to Serie B in 2007 as Group B champion. The team relegated back to Prima Divisione in 2008. On 2 February 2009 he was exchanged with Antonio Rizzo of Cremonese. He only played 18 games in 2009–10 Lega Pro Prima Divisione.

Carrarese
On 6 August 2010 he was transferred to Seconda Divisione side Carrarese. he played 25 games and plus all 4 games in promotion play-offs, partnering Maikol Benassi. He also played the first two games of the cup. Carrarese was promoted as play-offs winner.

On 18 June 2011 he signed a new 1-year contract.

References

External links
 La Gazzetta dello Sport Profile (2007–08) 
 Football.it Profile 
 Carrarese Profile 

Italian footballers
Serie B players
Serie C players
Genoa C.F.C. players
U.S. Catanzaro 1929 players
U.S. Fiorenzuola 1922 S.S. players
Spezia Calcio players
Virtus Bergamo Alzano Seriate 1909 players
Ravenna F.C. players
U.S. Cremonese players
Carrarese Calcio players
Association football central defenders
Footballers from Genoa
1978 births
Living people
U.S. Imperia 1923 players